Iraia Iturregi Sustatxa (born 24 April 1985) is a Spanish football midfielder who played for Athletic Bilbao of Spain's Primera División for most of her career. She currently acts as head coach of women's team Athletic Bilbao B.

Career
Despite playing all her entire career at Basque teams, Iturregi has also played in United States's NCAA for Florida State Seminoles.

In May 2017, she announced her retirement from playing professional football.

International career
Iturregi has been a member of the Spanish national team. Previously she scored the winner in the final of the 2004 Under-19 European Championship, Spain's first triumph in women's football. Iturregi was the team's captain and top scorer joint with Jade Boho. Two months later she played her first match with the senior national team, against Norway in the 2005 European Championship qualifying.

Honours

Club
 Athletic Bilbao
 Primera División (4): 2002–03, 2003–04, 2004–05, 2015–16

International
 Spain
 UEFA Women's Under-19 Championship (1): 2004

References

External links
 
 Iraia Iturregi at La Liga 
 
 
 
 

1985 births
Living people
Women's association football midfielders
Spanish women's footballers
Footballers from Bilbao
Primera División (women) players
Athletic Club Femenino players
Florida State Seminoles women's soccer players
Spain women's international footballers
Expatriate women's soccer players in the United States
Spanish expatriate sportspeople in the United States
Spanish expatriate women's footballers
Athletic Bilbao non-playing staff
Athletic Club Femenino managers
Primera División (women) managers
Spanish football managers
Spain women's youth international footballers
21st-century Spanish women